Dichloramine is a reactive inorganic compound. It has the formula . The yellow gas is unstable and reacts with many materials. It is formed by a reaction between ammonia and chlorine or sodium hypochlorite. It is a byproduct formed during the synthesis of monochloramine and nitrogen trichloride.

Synthesis 
Dichloramine can be prepared by a reaction between monochloramine and chlorine or sodium hypochlorite:

NH2Cl + Cl2 → NHCl2 + HCl

Reaction  
Dichloramine reacts with hydroxyl ion, which can be present in water or comes from water molecules, to yield nitroxyl radical and the chloride ion.

References 

Inorganic amines
Inorganic chlorine compounds
Chlorides
Nitrogen halides
Gases with color